Almost My Record is an extended play released by American country music singer Sarah Buxton. It was released in 2007 via Lyric Street Records. The album includes the singles "Innocence," "That Kind of Day" and "Space," all of which charted in the top 40 of the Billboard Hot Country Songs chart. Also included is her rendition of "Stupid Boy," which Keith Urban released as a single from his 2006 album Love, Pain & the Whole Crazy Thing.

It received a positive review from Country Standard Time critic Michael Sudhalter, who thought that "Stupid Boy" worked better from a female's perspective, and called "Innocence" "one of the best songs about reminiscing of young love since Deana Carter's 'Strawberry Wine'."

Track listing

"Space" (Sarah Buxton, Chuck Cannon, Lari White) – 3:15
"American Daughters" (Buxton, Bob DiPiero) – 3:47
"That Kind of Day" (Buxton, Greg Barnhill, Jeremy Stover) – 3:25
"Innocence" (Buxton, Stover, Dave Berg, Georgia Middleman) – 3:42
"Love Is a Trip" (Lee Thomas Miller, Craig Wiseman) – 3:46
"Stupid Boy" (Berg, Deanna Bryant, Buxton) – 5:32

References

2007 debut EPs
Sarah Buxton albums
Lyric Street Records EPs
Albums produced by Dann Huff